Banoth Chandravathi is an Indian politician and legislator. She represents Wyra assembly constituency in Khammam district. Earlier she was with CPI party. In April 2014, she joined TRS (Telangana Rashtra Samithi) party.

Early life and background 
She was born in Lambada, a tribal community. She completed her M.B.B.S from Andhra Medical College, Visakhapatnam in 2007.

Political career
Chandravathi was elected to the Assembly in 2009. She is the youngest legislator in Andhra Pradesh Legislative Assembly. She married her childhood friend, Suresh in 2011.

Positions held

References

People from Khammam district
Telangana politicians
Women in Telangana politics
Communist Party of India politicians from Telangana
Telangana Rashtra Samithi politicians
Telugu people
Living people
21st-century Indian women politicians
21st-century Indian politicians
Year of birth missing (living people)